Gerhard Stoltenberg (29 September 1928 – 23 November 2001) was a German politician of the Christian Democratic Union (CDU) and minister in the cabinets of Ludwig Erhard, Kurt Georg Kiesinger and Helmut Kohl. He served as Minister-President of Schleswig-Holstein from 1971 to 1982 and as President of the Bundesrat from 1977 to 1978.

Life

Early life and career 
Stoltenberg was born in Kiel in northern Germany. In 1944 he became a navy assistant (HJ-Marinehelfer), a Hitler Youth auxiliary in the Kriegsmarine. After the war, when he was no longer a prisoner of war, he completed his Abitur in 1949. Stoltenberg began studying history, sociology and philosophy at the University of Kiel. In 1954 he graduated as a Doctor of Philosophy and worked as an academic in Kiel. In 1960 he became a professor (Privatdozent). In the years 1965 and from 1969 to 1970, Stoltenberg was the director of Friedrich Krupp GmbH in Essen.

Political career 
Since 1947 Stoltenberg had been member of the CDU. In the years 1955 to 1961, he was federal leader of the Junge Union, the youth' organisation of the CDU. From 1955 Stoltenberg had different positions in the CDU. From 1971 until 1989, he was chairman of the CDU in the state of Schleswig-Holstein. Moreover, Stoltenberg served as vice chairman of the federal CDU since 1969.

Stoltenberg was member of the state parliament of Schleswig-Holstein from 1954 to 1957, and from 1971 to 1982. From 1957 to 1971, and from 1983 until 1998, Stoltenberg also served as a member of the federal German legislature, the Bundestag. As a junior member of parliament and member of the budget committee, he was the first to introduce to the 1959 federal budget a flat grant of DM 5,000,000 for political education (training of party activists) to be transferred to federal party headquarters.

Gerhard Stoltenberg looked destined for West Germany's highest office as he made a brilliant start to his political career. On 24 May 1971, Stoltenberg was elected minister-president of the state of Schleswig-Holstein and remained in this position until 1982.

In 1982, he became federal minister of finance under chancellor Helmut Kohl. He left this position when he was appointed minister of defence from 1989 on, replacing Rupert Scholz. He resigned from this position on 31 March 1992.

Stoltenberg died in Bad Godesberg in 2001.

Personal life
Stoltenberg was married and had two children. He was a member of the Lutheran church.

See also
List of Minister-Presidents of Schleswig-Holstein

References

1928 births
2001 deaths
Defence ministers of Germany
Finance ministers of Germany
German Lutherans
Kriegsmarine personnel of World War II
Members of the Landtag of Schleswig-Holstein
Ministers-President of Schleswig-Holstein
Presidents of the German Bundesrat
Members of the Bundestag for Schleswig-Holstein
Members of the Bundestag 1994–1998
Members of the Bundestag 1990–1994
Members of the Bundestag 1987–1990
Members of the Bundestag 1983–1987
Members of the Bundestag 1969–1972
Members of the Bundestag 1965–1969
Members of the Bundestag 1961–1965
Members of the Bundestag 1957–1961
Politicians from Kiel
People from the Province of Schleswig-Holstein
Grand Crosses 1st class of the Order of Merit of the Federal Republic of Germany
University of Kiel alumni
Members of the Bundestag for the Christian Democratic Union of Germany
20th-century Lutherans
Hitler Youth members
Child soldiers in World War II
German prisoners of war in World War II